The Gaia Sausage or Gaia Enceladus is the remains of a dwarf galaxy (the Sausage Galaxy, or Gaia-Enceladus-Sausage, or Gaia-Sausage-Enceladus) that merged with the Milky Way about 8–11 billion years ago. At least eight globular clusters were added to the Milky Way along with 50 billion solar masses of stars, gas and dark matter. It represents the last major merger of the Milky Way.

Etymology
The "Gaia Sausage" is so-called because of the characteristic sausage shape of the population in a chart of velocity space, in particular a plot of radial versus azimuthal velocity of stars (See spherical coordinate system), using data from the Gaia Mission. The stars that have merged with the Milky Way have orbits that are highly elongated. The outermost points of their orbits are around 20 kiloparsecs from the Galactic Center at what is called the "halo break". These stars had previously been seen in Hipparcos data  and identified as originаting from an accreted galaxy.

The name "Enceladus" refers to the mythological giant Enceladus, who was buried under Mount Etna and caused earthquakes. Thus this former galaxy was buried in the Milky Way, and caused the puffing up of the thick disc.

Components

Globular clusters 
The globular clusters firmly identified as former Sausage members are Messier 2, Messier 56, Messier 75, Messier 79, NGC 1851, NGC 2298, and NGC 5286.

NGC 2808: Globular cluster or old core?

NGC 2808 is another globular-like cluster of Sausage. This cluster is composed of three generations of stars, all born within 200 million years of the formation of the cluster.

One theory to account for three generations of stars is that NGC 2808 is the former core of Sausage. This is also an explanation for the number of stars, more than a million, which is unusually large for a globular cluster.

Stars 
The stars from this dwarf orbit the Milky Way core with extreme eccentricities on the order of about 0.9. Their metallicity is also typically higher than other halo stars, with most having [Fe/H] > −1.7 dex, i.e., at least 2% of the solar value

The "Gaia Sausage" reconstructed the Milky Way by puffing up the thin disk to make it a thick disk, whilst the gas it brought into the Milky Way triggered a fresh round of star formation and replenished the thin disk. The debris from the dwarf galaxy provides most of the metal-rich part of the galactic halo.

See also
 Field of Streams
 Monoceros Ring
 Omega Centauri
 M32p, large galaxy merged into Andromeda Galaxy, responsible for its thick disc and most halo stars
 J1124+4535
 Kraken galaxy, another proposed large galaxy merged into Milky Way but earlier, contributed at least some of the surviving 150 globular clusters to the Milky Way.

References

Further reading

External links
 
 
 

 
Milky Way
Dwarf galaxies